(), also known as  , c. 670 CE/50 AH - 714 CE/96 AH), was an Islamic theologian and jurist. Though belonging to the generation following the companions of Muhammad (the ), he still met many of them during his lifetime, including Anas ibn Malik and Aisha bint Abi Bakr.

Notes 

670 births
710s deaths
Year of birth uncertain
Year of death uncertain
People from Medina
Sunni Muslim scholars of Islam
8th-century Muslim theologians
7th-century Muslim scholars of Islam
7th-century Muslim theologians
Tabi‘un hadith narrators